Antara Kak is an Indian film director and producer, predominantly based in India. She is daughter of Siddharth Kak (of Surabhi fame) and his wife, Gita Siddharth. Antara won acclaim and an award for her debut venture: A Life in Dance - Daksha Sheth.

Early life and background
Antara studied English literature at Mithibai College.

Career
Antara Kak began her career as an assistant director, assisting her father Siddharth Kak. She worked as an assistant director working primarily on non-fiction shows and documentaries. She spent eight years working on the program Surabhi, which was produced by her father, Siddharth Kak. She went on to direct the documentary A Life in Dance which earned her the debut director award from the Indian Documentary Producers Association. Kak was also the creative director for Mano Ya Na Mano  on the former channel Star One as well as the supernatural thriller Sambhav Kya'' on 9X.

Filmography

References

Indian women film directors
Living people
Indian women film producers
Place of birth missing (living people)
Hindi film producers
Hindi-language film directors
Year of birth missing (living people)